The Catalina 309 is an American sailboat, that was designed by Gerry Douglas and first built in 2005.

Production
The boat was built by Catalina Yachts in the United States starting in 2005, but is now out of production.

Design

The Catalina 309 is a small recreational keelboat, built predominantly of fiberglass. It has a fractional sloop rig, an internally-mounted spade-type rudder and a fixed fin keel. It displaces  and carries  of ballast.

Operational history
The design was named a Boat of the Year winner by Cruising World magazine for 2007, including "top overall Domestic Boat of the Year award".

See also

List of sailing boat types

Similar sailboats
Alberg 30
Alberg Odyssey 30
Aloha 30
Annie 30
Bahama 30
Bristol 29.9
C&C 1/2 Ton
C&C 30
C&C 30 Redwing
CS 30
Grampian 30
Hunter 30
Hunter 30T
Hunter 30-2
Hunter 306
J/30
Kirby 30
Leigh 30
Mirage 30
Mirage 30 SX
Nonsuch 30
Pearson 303
Tanzer 31

References

External links

Keelboats
2000s sailboat type designs
Sailing yachts
Sailboat types built by Catalina Yachts
Sailboat type designs by Gerry Douglas